Jaanus Tamkivi (born 17 November 1959 in Kuressaare) is an Estonian politician of the Estonian Reform Party. He was Mayor of Kuressaare from 1996 to 2005, a member of the Riigikogu from 2005 to 2015, and the Minister of the Environment from 2007 to 2011. Currently he is the chairman of Saaremaa Municipality Council.

References

1959 births
Living people
People from Kuressaare
Estonian Reform Party politicians
Environment ministers of Estonia
Members of the Riigikogu, 2003–2007
Members of the Riigikogu, 2007–2011
Members of the Riigikogu, 2011–2015
Mayors of Kuressaare
21st-century Estonian politicians